The Liberal Alliance (LA) ( in Danish) is a classical liberal and right-libertarian political party in Denmark.

The party is a component of the centre-right bloc in Danish politics. The party's platform is based upon economic liberalism, promotion of tax cuts and reduction of welfare programmes, and a critical, oppositional stance towards European integration.

From November 2016 to June 2019, the Liberal Alliance (I) was part of a three-party coalition government alongside Liberal Party and the Conservative People's Party. Following the 2022 general election the party currently holds 14 seats.

History

2007–2009: New Alliance

The party was founded as the New Alliance on 7 May 2007 by MP Naser Khader, MEP Anders Samuelsen from the Social Liberal Party and Gitte Seeberg, a Conservative People's Party MEP. The party supported the government of the Venstre and Conservative People's Party also endoreced by the Danish People's Party. To comply with Danish election law and to be able to stand for elections the New Alliance had to gather 19,185 signatures of supporters on special forms, the number being equivalent to one parliamentary seat in the Folketing. Each completed form had to be certified with the civil registry offices of municipalities before being collectively handed in to the Ministry of the Interior. While the New Alliance did not take any stand on this offer, the minor party Centre Democrats offered to let the New Alliance put forward candidates on their lists in the event of an election being called before the New Alliance had finished its nomination process.

On one occasion on 12 May 2007 in Horsens, the three leading figures of the party managed to collect over 2,000 signatures in one day. On 21 May, the party reported they were half-way, having gathered in 10,000 signatures with the requirement being 19,185 (1/175 of the votes cast at the latest general elction). The party completed its nomination process on 29 June by being accepted on the Ministry of the Interior's list of parties eligible stand for election to the Folketing after handing in the 21,516 required signatures and was given the party letter Y. Immediately after its creation, the New Alliance had a surge of members. Just one day after the announcement of the party, more than 12,000 had registered on the party website. Three days later, 16,000 had registered and 8,000 of these had paid the membership fee.

On 30 August 2007, the party publicly launched a policy programme. Some of the points in this programme included longer mandatory school attendance, with free food and homework aid; a European Marshall Plan to the Middle East; increasing foreign aid to 1% of GDP; increased focus on prevention in public health, with lower prices on healthy foods; and an exhaustive reform related to immigration and asylum politics. In the 2007 general election held on 13 November 2007, the party won 2.8% of the vote, winning 5 of 179 seats in the Danish Parliament.

2008–2019: Rebranding and Samuelsen leadership 
On 29 January 2008, founding member Gitte Seeberg left the party in protest against the party's status as a right-wing party which conflicted with her own desire to form a centrist party with the goald of mitigating the influence of the Danish People's Party. On 5 February 2008, Malou Aamund, another of the party's members of parliament, left the party and joined the governing party Venstre. On 24 June 2008, Jørgen Poulsen was excluded from the Liberal Alliance's parliamentary group, although not from the party itself. Under the new leadership of Anders Samuelsen, the party position moved towards the right, espousing economic liberalism and right-libertarian policies, with the party changing its name to the Liberal Alliance on 27 August 2008.

On 1 September 2008, the party regained a third mandate in the parliament as Gitte Seeberg was appointed secretary general of the Danish branch of the World Wide Fund for Nature (WWF). Her mandate was given to former deputy mayor of Slagelse, Villum Christensen. On 5 January 2009, founding member and party leader Naser Khader left the party, citing that he did not believe in it any longer. At the time, Anders Samuelsen was scheduled to take over leadership of the party later that month. That same day, Villum Christensen expressed doubt on his future in the party. After Khader's exit a 2009 documentary titled Dagbog fra midten (Diary from the Centre) documenting the party's founding and eventual collapse was released with scenes detaling internal disagremments between the party's lead members. Khader eventually joined the Conservatives who he represented as an MP from 2009–2011 and 2015–2021 where he after a period as an independent left politics for good in 2022.

In the 2009 European Parliament election, the party won 0.6% of the vote, leaving the party without representation in the European parliament. In the 2011 general election held on 15 September 2011, the party won 5.0% of the vote and 9 seats. When Malou Aamund resigned from the Folketing in June 2011, she was replaced by Professor Niels Høiby, who took his seat with the Liberal Alliance, taking their contingent in four. In the 2014 European Parliament election, the Liberal Alliance received 2.9% of the vote, again failing to return any MEPs.

In the 2015 general election held on 18 June 2015, the party won 7.5% of the vote and 13 seats in the Folketing. In its most successful constituency, Gentofte Municipality, a well-off suburb of Copenhagen, it even scored 17.5% while on Bornholm its share of votes was only 4%. Initially, the party did not participate in Lars Løkke Rasmussen's Venstre minority cabinet, but it did lent its parliamentary support to the government.

Participation in third Løkke government 
In late November 2016, it joined a three-party centre-right coalition government alongside Venstre and the Conservative People's Party in Løkke Rasmussen's third government. Party leader Anders Samuelsen was appointed Minister of Foreign Affairs while Simon Emil Ammitzbøll-Bille took the post of Minister of the Economy and Interior. Additional cabinet members of Liberal Alliance were Merete Riisager (Minister of Education), Mette Bock (Minister of Culture), Ole Birk Olesen (Minister of Transport) and Thyra Frank (Minister for Elder Affairs).

At the 2019 general election held on 5 June 2019, the party won 2.3% of the vote, losing 9 of its 13 seats in the Folketing. At the same time, party leader Anders Samuelsen failed to get reelected. resulting in his resignation.

2019–present: Vanopslagh leadership 
On 9 June 2019, Alex Vanopslagh became the new leader of the Liberal Alliance with MP Simon Emil Ammitzbøll-Bille leaving the LA on 23 October attributing poltical disagreements as the reason. At the 2021 local elections, LA achived it first ever mayor with LA candidate Emil Blücher becoming mayor in Solrød Municipality. During the election campaign to the 2022 general election, the party ran on a campagin called Du kan godt roughly translating to 'You can' or 'Yes, you can'. Furthermore, Vanopslagh managed to acquire a large following on the social media platform TikTok especially engaging younger voters. At that election, the party received its best ever result receiving 7.9% equal to 14 seats making it the joint fifth-largest party in the Folketing alongside the Denmark Democrats. Following the formation of the SVM government, the LA is currently in opposition.

Ideology and platform 
Located on the centre-right to right-wing of the political spectrum, the Liberal Alliance has been described in ideology as liberal, classical liberal, libertarian, and right-wing libertarian.

The original New Alliance considered itself a centrist party, "taking the best values of social liberalism and social conservatism". By using these two terms, the New Alliance positioned itself equidistant between the former parties of the three founding members. Social liberalism is the official ideology of the Danish Social Liberal Party whereas social conservatism is a term sometimes invoked by members of the Conservative People's Party who stress the support of the welfare society such as Liberal Alliance co-founder Gitte Seeberg. In the earliest days of the party's existence, the party was accused of populism or personalism, still lacking stances on many topics and based on the popularity of Naser Khader. After Gitte Seeberg left the party, the "social conservatism" part was dropped and the party name was changed to the Liberal Alliance. However, there were still considerable ideological differences among the two remaining founders and it was not until Naser Khader was replaced by Anders Samuelsen that the party took on a more classical liberal identity. The party has proposed extensive economic liberal reforms, including a tax reform replacing progressive income tax with a flat-rate income tax of 40%, halving rates of corporation tax, instigating user charges for public healthcare, abolishing  early retirement schemes and reassessing everyone receiving disability benefits.

In 2011, the party opposed the government's entry of Denmark into the Euro Plus Pact and continues to maintain a staunch opposition to Denmark entering the eurozone. On the matter of European Union membership, the party supports a radically reinvented European Union based on free trade and in 2022 called for a "slimmed down" EU based solely on economic partnership while restoring political sovereignty from Brussels to national parliaments. Individual politicians in the Liberal Alliance and its youth wing support Denmark exiting the EU (Danexit), although remaining in the single market. The Liberal Alliance is the only party in Denmark that supports nuclear power. In 2009, the party voted against subsidies for environmentalist renovations without significant tax cuts. In 2011, the Red–Green Alliance and the Liberal Alliance were the only parties whose MPs supported equalising MPs' age of retirement with the rest of the country.

The Liberal Alliance has supported the rights of same-sex couples to marry and adopt, helping to pass both into law. The party opposed the reintroduction of border controls in 2011 and supported the dismantling of them later in that year. It supports ending the ban on foreigners owning holiday homes in Denmark. On 30 August 2011, with 5.0% voter support, Simon Emil Ammitzbøll-Bille told on air to Danish Radio that a vote for the Liberal Alliance is a vote for free hashish. Voter support increased to 7.5% following the statement. In parliament, the party supported the reduction of vehicle registration fees.

Organisation

Funding 
The party received donations from the investment bank Saxo Bank (500,000 Danish kroner) and the businessman Lars Kolind (100,000 kroner). As of 22 May 2007, the party had seven paid employees and a number of volunteers. The party announced it would not hire additional employees until it had more funds.

Liberal Alliance Youth 

On 23 February 2008, a youth wing to the party was formed by 21 people under the name of Young Alliance. When the party changed its name to the Liberal Alliance, the youth branch followed suit changing its name to the Liberal Alliance Youth (Liberal Alliances Ungdom) whose current chairman is Simon Fendinge Olsen.

European parliament affiliations 
At its formation, two MEPs joined the party. With the defection of MEPs Gitte Seeberg and Anders Samuelsen, the Conservatives and the Danish Social Liberal Party were effectively left without representation in the European Parliament. The two MEPs did stay in their parliamentary groups (EPP-ED and ALDE, respectively). Both resigned from the European Parliament after being elected to the Danish Parliament in November 2007. The Liberal Alliance announced that it would join the ALDE group after future European Parliament elections. However, the party failed to achieve representation in the European Parliament in both the 2009 and 2014 European Parliament elections.

Leaders 
The party has had the following leaders since its foundation:

List of government participation 

 2016–2019 with Venstre (V) and the Conservative People's Party (C)

Election results

Parliament

Local elections

European Parliament

Elected representatives

Parliament 

Since its formation, the party has had thirty MPs, more specifically the following ones:

 Malou Aamund (2007–2008)
 Simon Emil Ammitzbøll-Bille (2009–2019)
 Carsten Bach (2015–2019, 2022–present)
 Mette Bock (2011–2019)
 May-Britt Buch-Kattrup (2015–2019)
 Villum Christensen (2008–2019)
 Henrik Dahl (2015–present)
 Christina Egelund (2015–2019)
 Thyra Frank (2011–2015)
 Niels Høiby (2011)
 Naser Khader (2007–2009)
 Laura Lindahl (2015–2019)
 Leif Mikkelsen (2011–2019)
 Ole Birk Olesen (2011–present)
 Joachim Olsen (2011–2019)
 Jørgen Poulsen  (2007–2008)
 Merete Riisager (2011–2019)
 Anders Samuelsen (2007–2019)
 Gitte Seeberg (2007–2008)
 Alex Vanopslagh (2019–present)
 Sólbjørg Jakobsen (2022–present)
 Lars-Christian Brask (2022–present)
 Katrine Daugaard (2022–present)
 Steffen Frølund (2022–present)
 Alexander Ryle (2022–present)
 Jens Meilvang (2022–present)
 Steffen Larsen (2022–present)
 Helena Artmann Andresen (2022–present)
 Louise Brown (2022–present)
 Sandra Elisabeth Skalvig (2022–present)

See also 
 Liberal Initiative (Portugal)

Notes

References

External links 

 Official website 
 Popular MP to create own party. Copenhagen Post. 7 May 2007.
 PM's majority down to two seats. Copenhagen Post. 11 May 2007.
 Reimann, Anna (7 November 2007). "Muslim Politician Could Be Surprise Kingmaker" By Anna Reimann. Spiegel.

2007 establishments in Denmark
Centre-right parties in Europe
Classical liberal parties
Liberalism in Denmark
Liberal parties in Denmark
Libertarian parties
Political parties established in 2007
Right-libertarianism
Right-wing parties in Europe